The 2003 Giro d'Italia was the 86th edition of the Giro d'Italia, one of cycling's Grand Tours. The Giro began in Lecce with a  mass-start stage. The race came to a close with a  individual time trial that began and ended in the Italian city of Milan. Nineteen teams entered the race that was won by the Italian Gilberto Simoni of the  team. Second and third were the Italian Stefano Garzelli and Ukrainian Yaroslav Popovych.

It was Simoni's second win in the Giro. After the race, it was discovered that sixth-placed Raimondas Rumšas had tested positive in this Giro.

This edition of the Giro was the first UCI endorsed race where the wearing of helmets was compulsory.

With Gilberto Simoni's general classification victories in 2003 and in 2001, Simoni became the eighteenth rider to repeat as winner of the Giro d'Italia. In addition to the general classification, Simoni also won the points classification. In the race's other classifications,  rider Fredy González won the mountains classification and Magnus Bäckstedt of the Team Fakta-Pata Chips team won the intergiro classification.  finished as the winners of the Trofeo Fast Team classification, ranking each of the nineteen teams contesting the race by lowest cumulative time.

Teams

A total of 19 teams were invited to participate in the 2003 Giro d'Italia. Each team sent a squad of nine riders (only Kelme–Costa Blanca started eight), so the Giro began with a peloton of 170 cyclists. Out of the 170 riders that started this edition of the Giro d'Italia, a total of 97 riders made it to the finish in Milan.

The 19 teams that took part in the race were:

Route and stages

The route for the 2003 Giro d'Italia was unveiled by race director Carmine Castellano on 30 November 2002 in Milan. It contained two time trial events, all of which were individual. The organizers divided the remaining eighteen stages into three categories: flat stages, rolling stages, and mountain stages. Twelve of the stages were declared flat stages. Of the seven stages remaining, three stages were designated rolling stages and three were ranked as mountain stages. In the stages containing categorized climbs, six had summit finishes: stage 3, to Terme Luigiane; stage 7, to Monte Terminillo; stage 12, to Monte Zoncolan; stage 14, to Alpe di Pampeago; stage 18, to Chianale; and stage 19, to Cascata del Toce. The organizers chose to include two rest days. When compared to the previous year's race, the race was  longer, contained the same amount of rest days, and one less individual time trial. In addition, this race lacked an opening prologue like the previous year had.

Classification leadership

In the 2003 Giro d'Italia, five different jerseys were awarded. For the general classification, calculated by adding each cyclist's finishing times on each stage, and allowing time bonuses for the first three finishers on mass-start stages, the leader received a pink jersey. This classification is considered the most important of the Giro d'Italia, and the winner is considered the winner of the Giro.

Additionally, there was a points classification, which awarded a mauve jersey. In the points classification, cyclists got points for finishing in the top 15 in a stage. The stage win awarded 25 points, second place awarded 20 points, third 16, fourth 14, fifth 12, sixth 10, and one point fewer per place down the line, to a single point for 15th. In addition, points could be won in intermediate sprints.

There was also a mountains classification, which awarded a green jersey. In the mountains classifications, points were won by reaching the top of a mountain before other cyclists. Each climb was categorized as either first, second, or third category, with more points available for the higher-categorized climbs. The highest point in the Giro (called the Cima Coppi), which in 2003 was the Colle d'Esischie, afforded more points than the other first-category climbs.

The fourth jersey represented the intergiro classification, marked by a blue jersey. The calculation for the intergiro is similar to that of the general classification, in each stage there is a midway point that the riders pass through a point and where their time is stopped. As the race goes on, their times compiled and the person with the lowest time is the leader of the intergiro classification and wears the blue jersey.

There were also two classifications for teams. The first was the Trofeo Fast Team. In this classification, the times of the best three cyclists per team on each stage were added; the leading team was the team with the lowest total time. The Trofeo Super Team was a team points classification, with the top 20 placed riders on each stage earning points (20 for first place, 19 for second place and so on, down to a single point for 20th) for their team.

The rows in the following table correspond to the jerseys awarded after that stage was run.

Final standings

General classification

Points classification

Mountains classification

Intergiro classification

Trofeo Fast Team classification

Trofeo Super Team classification

Minor classifications

Other less well-known classifications, whose leaders did not receive a special jersey, were awarded during the Giro. Other awards included the Combativity classification, which was a compilation of points gained for position on crossing intermediate sprints, mountain passes and stage finishes. Colombian Fredy González won the Most Combative classification. The Azzurri d'Italia classification was based on finishing order, but points were awarded only to the top three finishers in each stage. The Azzurri d'Italia classification was won by Gilberto Simoni. The Trofeo Fuga Piaggio classification rewarded riders who took part in a breakaway at the head of the field, each rider in an escape of ten or fewer riders getting one point for each kilometre that the group stayed clear. The classification was won by Constantino Zaballa. Teams were given penalty points for minor technical infringements.  was the most successful in avoiding penalties after not being penalized during the race, and so won the Fair Play classification.

References

Citations

 
2003 in road cycling
2003 in Italian sport
2003
May 2003 sports events in Europe
June 2003 sports events in Europe